Peder Jacobsen Bøgvald (1762 – 16 November 1829) was a Norwegian sea captain, farmer and politician.

Bøgvald was born on the Sande farm in the Feda parish of  Kvinesdal  in Vest-Agder, Norway. He had left the district at a young age to work at sea. Many years later he returned to Feda, having worked himself upwards as a shipmaster in the Netherlands.

He was elected to the Norwegian Parliament for its first session in 1814, and was re-elected in 1815.  Together with Teis Lundegaard, he represented the rural constituency of Lister og Mandals Amt (now Vest-Agder).

References

1762 births
1829 deaths
people from Kvinesdal 
Members of the Storting
Vest-Agder politicians
Norwegian farmers
Norwegian sailors